John Drayton II (June 22, 1766 – November 27, 1822) was Governor of South Carolina and a United States district judge of the United States District Court for the District of South Carolina.

Education and career

Born on June 22, 1766, in Charleston, Province of South Carolina, British America, to William Henry Drayton and Dorothy Golightly, Drayton read law in 1788 at the Inner Temple in London, England. He engaged in private practice in Charleston, South Carolina in 1788, from 1789 to 1794, from 1796 to 1798, and from 1811 to 1812. He was a warden (assistant to the intendant) for Charleston starting in 1788. He was a rice planter in Georgetown County, South Carolina from 1794 to 1822. He was a member of the South Carolina House of Representatives from 1792 to 1796. He was Lieutenant Governor of South Carolina from 1798 to 1800. He was Governor of South Carolina from 1801 to 1803, and from 1809 to 1810. He was the Intendant (Mayor) of Charleston from 1803 to 1805. He was a member of the South Carolina Senate from 1805 to 1808. He was a member of the Democratic-Republican Party.

Federal judicial service

Drayton was nominated by President James Madison on May 4, 1812, to a seat on the United States District Court for the District of South Carolina vacated by Judge Thomas Bee. He was confirmed by the United States Senate on May 7, 1812, and received his commission the same day. His service terminated on November 27, 1822, due to his death in Charleston.

Notable case

Drayton issued perhaps the earliest judicial decision holding that, under the laws of the United States, slaves captured in time of war on enemy ships could not be claimed as property.

Books
 Carolinian Florist
 A View of South Carolina, as Respects Her Natural and Civil Concerns
 Memoirs of the American Revolution from its Commencement to the Year 1776

References

Further sources

External links
 SCIway Biography of John Drayton
 NGA Biography of John Drayton

1766 births
1822 deaths
Princeton University alumni
University of South Carolina alumni
Members of the South Carolina House of Representatives
Lieutenant Governors of South Carolina
Governors of South Carolina
University of South Carolina trustees
South Carolina state senators
Writers from South Carolina
Drayton family
Mayors of Charleston, South Carolina
Judges of the United States District Court for the District of South Carolina
United States federal judges appointed by James Madison
19th-century American judges
South Carolina Democratic-Republicans
Democratic-Republican Party state governors of the United States
United States federal judges admitted to the practice of law by reading law